Frances Mary Slaap (born 25 June 1941) is a British athlete. She competed in the women's high jump at the 1960 Summer Olympics and the 1964 Summer Olympics. She also represented England in the 80 metres hurdles and high jump at the 1962 British Empire and Commonwealth Games in Perth, Western Australia.

References

1941 births
Living people
Athletes (track and field) at the 1960 Summer Olympics
Athletes (track and field) at the 1964 Summer Olympics
British female high jumpers
Olympic athletes of Great Britain
Place of birth missing (living people)
Athletes (track and field) at the 1962 British Empire and Commonwealth Games
Commonwealth Games competitors for England